Dolichancistrus pediculatus is a species of catfish in the family Loricariidae. It is a freshwater fish native to South America, where it occurs in the Meta River basin in Colombia. The species reaches 12 cm (4.7 inches) in total length.

References 

Ancistrini
Catfish of South America